The 18th Cannes Film Festival was held from 3 to 16 May 1965. Olivia de Havilland became the first woman president of the jury.

The Grand Prix du Festival International du Film went to The Knack …and How to Get It by Richard Lester. The festival opened with The Collector, directed by William Wyler and closed with Tōkyō Orinpikku, directed by Kon Ichikawa.

Jury

The following people were appointed as the Jury of the 1965 film competition:

Feature films
Olivia de Havilland (USA) Jury President
André Maurois (France) Honorary President
Goffredo Lombardo (Italy) Vice President
Max Aub (Mexico)
Michel Aubriant (France) (journalist)
Rex Harrison (UK)
François Reichenbach (France)
Alain Robbe-Grillet (France)
Konstantin Simonov (Soviet Union)
Edmond Ténoudji (France)
Jerzy Toeplitz (Poland)
Short films
Gérardot (France) President
Istvan Dosai (Hungary) (Cinématographie official)
Herman van der Horst (Netherlands)
Jacques Ledoux (Belgium)
Carlos Vilardebó (France)

Official selection

In competition – Feature film
The following feature films competed for the Grand Prix International du Festival:

The 317th Platoon (La 317ème section) by Pierre Schoendoerffer
Always Further On (Tarahumara (Cada vez más lejos)) by Luis Alcoriza
Circus Angel (Fifi la plume) by Albert Lamorisse
Clay by Giorgio Mangiamele
The Collector by William Wyler
Az Életbe táncoltatott leány by Tamás Banovich
The First Day of Freedom (Pierwszy dzien wolnosci) by Aleksander Ford
Forest of the Hanged (Padurea spânzuratilor) by Liviu Ciulei
Al Haram by Henry Barakat
The Hill by Sidney Lumet
The Ipcress File by Sidney J. Furie
The Knack …and How to Get It by Richard Lester
Kwaidan by Masaki Kobayashi
The Lark (Zhavoronok) by Nikita Kurikhin and Leonid Menaker
Loving Couples (Älskande par) by Mai Zetterling
Men and Women (Noite Vazia) by Walter Hugo Khouri
The Moment of Truth (Il momento della verità) by Francesco Rosi and Antonio Levesi Cervi
My Home Is Copacabana (Mitt hem är Copacabana) by Arne Sucksdorff
El Reñidero by René Múgica
The Shop on Main Street (Obchod na korze) by Ján Kadár and Elmar Klos
Snakes and Ladders (El juego de la oca) by Manuel Summers
There Was an Old Couple (Zhili-byli starik so starukhoj) by Grigori Chukhrai
Torrid Noon (Goreshto pladne) by Zako Heskija
Treason (Prodosia) by Kostas Manoussakis
The Uninhibited (Los pianos mecánicos) by Juan Antonio Bardem
Yo Yo by Pierre Étaix

Films out of competition
The following films were selected to be screened out of competition:

 Amsterdam by Herman Van Der Horst
 Le Cinquième Soleil by Jacqueline Grigaut-Lefevre
 In Harm's Way by Otto Preminger
 John F. Kennedy: Years of Lightning, Day of Drums by Bruce Herschensohn
 Mary Poppins by Robert Stevenson
 Tōkyō Orinpikku by Kon Ichikawa

Short film competition
The following short films competed for the Short Film Palme d'Or:

Aah... Tamara by Pim de la Parra
Anamniseis apo tin Ellada by Francis Carabott
Asinus by Vasil Mirchev
Au bord de la route by Chou-Tchen Wang
Ban ye ji jiao by Yeou Lei
Le Crocodile majuscule by Eddy Ryssack
Évariste Galois by Alexandre Astruc
Féerie du cuivre by Herbert E. Meyer
I videl sam daljine meglene i kalne by Zlatko Bourek
Johann Sebastian Bach: Fantasy in G minor by Jan Švankmajer
Los Junqueros by Oscar Kantor
The Legend of Jimmy Blue Eyes by Robert Clouse
Monsieur Plateau by Jean Brismée
Noworoczna noc by Jerzy Zitzman
Ohrid Express by Jean Dasque and Robert Legrand
Overture by János Vadász
Petrol-Carburant-Kraftstoff by Hugo Niebeling
Poprannii obet by Guénrikh Markarian
Processioni in Sicilia by Michele Gandin
Sanawat el magd by Atef Salem

Parallel section

International Critics' Week
The following feature films were screened for the 4th International Critics' Week (4e Semaine de la Critique):

 Amador by Francisco Regueiro (Spain)
 Andy by Richard C. Sarafian (United States)
 The Cat in the Bag (Le chat dans le sac) by Gilles Groulx (Canada)
 The Glass Cage (La cage de verre) by Philippe Arthuys, Jean-Louis Levi-Avarès (France, Israel)
 Hole in the Moon (Hor B'Levana) by Uri Zohar (Israel)
 It Happened Here by Kevin Brownlow, Andrew Mollo (United Kingdom)
 Walkover by Jerzy Skolimowski (Poland)
 Diamonds of the Night (Démanty noci) by Jan Nemec (Czechoslovakia)
 Passages from James Joyce's Finnegans Wake by Mary Ellen Bute (United States)

Awards

Official awards
The following films and people received the 1965 Official selection awards:
Grand Prix du Festival International du film: The Knack …and How to Get It by Richard Lester
Prix spécial du Jury: Kwaidan by Masaki Kobayashi
Best Director: Liviu Ciulei for Forest of the Hanged (Pădurea spânzuraţilor)
Best Screenplay:
Pierre Schoendoerffer for The 317th Platoon (La 317e Section)
Ray Rigby for The Hill
Best Actress: Samantha Eggar for The Collector
Best Actor: Terence Stamp for The Collector
Special Mention for actors:
Jozef Kroner and Ida Kaminska for their acting performances in Obchod na korze
Vera Kuznetsova for her acting performance in Zhili-byli starik so starukhoj
Short films
Short Film Palme d'Or: Overture by János Vadász
Prix du Jury: Johann Sebastian Bach: Fantasy in G minor by Jan Švankmajer
Prix spécial du Jury: Monsieur Plateau by Jean Brismée
Short film Technical Prize: Ban ye ji jiao by Yeou Lei & Overture by János Vadász

Independent awards
FIPRESCI
FIPRESCI Prize: Always Further On (Tarahumara (Cada vez más lejos)) by Luis Alcoriza
Commission Supérieure Technique
Technical Grand Prize:
Circus Angel (Fifi la plume) by Albert Lamorisse
Az Életbe táncoltatott leány by Tamás Banovich
Special Mention: The Knack …and How to Get It by Richard Lester
OCIC Award
OCIC Award: Yo Yo by Pierre Étaix
Best Film for the Youth
Los Junqueros by Oscar Kantor 
Yo Yo by Pierre Étaix

References

Media

British Pathé: Cannes Film Festival 1965 footage
British Pathé: Improvements in Cannes as 1965 Festival starts
INA: The films of the 1965 Festival (commentary in French)
INA: 1965: 18th anniversary of the Cannes festival (commentary in French)
INA: List of winners of the 1965 Cannes Festival (commentary in French)

External links 
1965 Cannes Film Festival (web.archive)
Official website Retrospective 1965 
Cannes Film Festival Awards for 1965 at Internet Movie Database

Cannes Film Festival, 1965
Cannes Film Festival, 1965
Cannes Film Festival